Lynda Boyd (born January 28, 1965) is a Canadian actress, singer, dancer, musician, and writer. She is perhaps best known for her roles in the films Final Destination 2 (2003), An Unfinished Life (2005), She's the Man (2006), and On Thin Ice, with Diane Keaton. She had minor roles in I Spy (2002), About A Girl (2007/08), The Fast and the Furious: Tokyo Drift (2006), and Intern Academy (2004). She was also the voice of Cologne in Ranma ½, and the voice of Viv the Bunny on the Sunbow cartoon series Littlest Pet Shop.

Career
She played the lead role for four seasons in WTN's You, Me, and the Kids. Boyd also wrote three of the episodes.

Boyd appeared as recurring villainess Dana Whitcomb in six episodes of SyFy Channel's Sanctuary from 2008-2009.

Boyd has garnered Gemini Award nominations for ABC Family Channel's Falcon Beach and Republic of Doyle.

A singer for many years, Boyd has starred in such musicals as The Rocky Horror Show, Guys and Dolls, and Little Shop of Horrors. She also sang and toured with The Blenders band in the 1980s.

Boyd is currently starring in the Canadian drama/comedy series Republic of Doyle as the character Rose Miller. In 2010, she was nominated for a Gemini Award in the category of Best Performance by an Actress in a Continuing Leading Dramatic Role for her role on the show.

On August 3, 2011, Boyd rowed in the legendary Royal St. John's Regatta for the Republic of Doyle sponsored women's crew. They came in second. Boyd said she rowed on a Vancouver team in the spring in order to prepare for the race.

Boyd was recently cast as a series regular in the role of Randy, opposite Christina Hendricks and Tim Roth in the western television series Tin Star debuting in 2017.

Filmography

References

External links

 Lynda Boyd's Official Site

1965 births
Living people
20th-century Canadian actresses
20th-century Canadian women singers
21st-century Canadian actresses
21st-century Canadian women singers
Actresses from Vancouver
Canadian female dancers
Canadian film actresses
Canadian musical theatre actresses
Canadian stage actresses
Canadian television actresses
Canadian voice actresses
Musicians from Vancouver